Hopper Mountain National Wildlife Refuge Complex is a National Wildlife Refuge complex in the state of California.

Refuges within the complex
 Bitter Creek National Wildlife Refuge
 Blue Ridge National Wildlife Refuge
 Hopper Mountain National Wildlife Refuge
 Guadalupe-Nipomo Dunes National Wildlife Refuge

References
Complex website

National Wildlife Refuges in California